Joy J. Kaimaparamban (Jōyi Je Kayimāparampan) (born 11 October 1939) is an Indian novelist writing mainly in Malayalam. Born to a middle-class family of Kerala, India, Kaimaparamban became an English teacher and served in many schools in Kerala.  He started his literary career at a young age and is still writing. He now lives in Vayalar, a small village in Alappuzha (Alleppey) district with his wife and two children. He has written several novels, some plays, and more than 100 short stories in his mother tongue, Malayalam. All of them were published through DC Books and SPCS, Kottayam. All India Radio has broadcast several of his short stories and dramas. He won an award in the name of Rabindranath Tagore, established by DC Books Kottayam in 1977, for his first novel Urayoorunna Pakalukal, and won the Kunkumam Prize in 1990, for his novel Theerabhoomikal. The Azure of Solicitude was his first novel in English, published by America print on demand publisher PublishAmerica September 2009. The Ayurvedic Healer is his second novel in English published by Copperhill Media Corporation. The Snake Charmer and the King Cobra is a collection of 30 short stories, published by Copperhill Media Corporation in 2013.

Books published in Malayalam

 Urayoorunna Pakalukal (The Slough Shedding Days) [1977, 1980, 1995]
 Ekanthatheeram (The Shore of Loneliness) [1977, 1999]
 Vazhiyariyathavar (Persons unaware of Path) [1977]
 Aswastha Sandhyakal (The unpleasant Dooms) [1978]
 Unmada Nimishangal (Moments of Hallucination) [1979]
 Dukham Thedunnavar(Seekers of Sadness) [1979]
 Manassile Nizhalukal (Shadows in the Mind) [1981]
 Thirichuvannavar (The Returnees) [1982]
 Puramthodukal (The Shells) [1984]
 Valayangal (The Circles) [1985]
 Vanantharngal (The Inner Forests) [1987]
 Theerabhoomikal (The Coastal Lands) [1990]
 Valmeekam (The Termitary) [1995]
 Saagarageethangal (Ballads of the Sea) [1999]

Children's literature

 Pathinonnu Bala Kathakal (11 Stories for Children) [1979]
 Sanchi Manushyan (The Bag Man) [1982, 2012]
 Parakkunna Paava (The Flying Doll) [1994]
 Bodhi: (The Enlightenment) [1994]

English
 The Snake Charmer and the King Cobra [2013]
 The Seagulls [2013]
 The Ayurvedic Healer [2010]
 The Azure of Solicitude [2009]

References

External links
Official website

1939 births
Living people
Malayalam novelists
Malayalam-language dramatists and playwrights
Malayalam short story writers
Writers from Alappuzha
Indian male short story writers
20th-century Indian dramatists and playwrights
Indian male novelists
Indian male dramatists and playwrights
Indian children's writers
20th-century Indian novelists
20th-century Indian short story writers
Novelists from Kerala
Dramatists and playwrights from Kerala
20th-century Indian male writers